The Children's War is a 2001 alternate history novel  by J.N. Stroyar. It was followed by the sequels A Change of Regime and Becoming Them. The book was the long form winner of the Sidewise Award for Alternate History in 2001.

Background

The point of divergence happens in 1941 when Adolf Hitler's astrologer convinced him that attacking the Soviet Union was a bad idea and the German nuclear weapons program saw better progress. Fifty years later, the truce between Nazi Germany, the Soviet Union, and the North American Union is still holding. The main character, Peter Halifax, finds himself betrayed by the British underground and forced into a life as a slave to a Nazi household, but later escapes to the Polish resistance.

Characters
 Peter Halifax/Alan Yardley (aliases for Niklaus Adolf Chase)
 Richard Traugutt (alias for Ryszard Przewalewski)
 Zosia Król
 Karl Vogel
 Elspeth Vogel
 Julia Hoffmeier
 Katerina Kalischer

Literary critique
The Bradenton Herald described The Children's War as "a brutal look at what might have been and a reminder of the price of freedom."

See also

Axis victory in World War II
The above page includes an extensive list of other Wikipedia articles regarding works of Nazi Germany/Axis/World War II alternate history.

References
Notes

Bibliography

External links
 Official J.N. Stroyar website
 The Children's War on Google Books

Sidewise Award for Alternate History winning works
Alternate Nazi Germany novels